The Road to Ruin is a 1970 album released by husband and wife John and Beverley Martyn.  It was the second (and last) album released as a duo. Island Records persuaded John Martyn to resume his solo career as they believed that the public was more interested in John as a solo artist rather than as part of a duo. The album marked the first collaboration on record between John and bassist Danny Thompson, who featured on many of Martyn's subsequent recordings.

The album's first track "Primrose Hill" written and sung by Beverley Martyn, and featuring Ray Warleigh on saxophone, about the simple joys of domesticity, was extensively sampled by Fatboy Slim for the track "North West Three" from his 2004 album Palookaville.

Track listing
All tracks composed by John Martyn except where indicated.

"Primrose Hill" (Beverley Martyn)
"Parcels"
"Auntie Aviator" (John & Beverley Martyn)
"New Day" 
"Give Us a Ring" (Paul Wheeler) 
"Sorry to Be So Long" (John & Beverley Martyn)
"Tree Green" 
"Say What You Can" (John & Beverley Martyn)  (titled "Let It Happen" on cover)
"Road to Ruin"

The remastered CD release includes the following previously unreleased track:
"Here I Am"

Personnel

Musicians
 John Martyn - vocals, guitar, harmonica, keyboards
 Beverley Martyn - vocals, guitar
 Dudu Pukwana - saxophone on "Road to Ruin", "Sorry to Be So Long" and "Say What You Can"
 Lyn Dobson - flute on "New Day"; saxophone on "Say What You Can"
 Dave Pegg - bass on "Say What You Can"and "Give Us a Ring"
 Rocky Dzidzornu - congas
 Paul Harris - keyboards
 Wells Kelly - drums on all tracks, except "Auntie Aviator"; bass on "Auntie Aviator"
 Mike Kowalski - drums on "Auntie Aviator"
 Alan Spenner - bass on "Primrose Hill", "Road to Ruin" and "Sorry to Be So Long"
 Ray Warleigh - saxophone on "Primrose Hill"
 Danny Thompson - double bass on "New Day"
Arrangement for "Say What You Can" by Tony Cox. All other arrangements by John Martyn and Paul Harris.

Technical
 John Wood - engineer
 Nigel Waymouth - design, photography
 Max Ernst - front cover engraving (from "Une Semaine De Bonté")

References

External links
John Martyn's Website
The Beverley Martyn Website

John Martyn albums
Island Records albums
1970 albums
Albums produced by Joe Boyd
Beverley Martyn albums
Warner Records albums